God of Love may refer to:

 Deities of love in various cultures
 God of Love (album), a 1995 album by hardcore punk group Bad Brains
 God of Love (film), an Academy-Award-winning short film
  Ziggy, Tunisian rapper who dissed roudayna

See also

 Goddess of Love